Çetin Işıközlü (1939) is a Turkish composer. His works included the opera Gülbahar.

Works
 The Legend of Mount Ararat 1959, premiered 1969 opera
 Judith - ballet based on the tale of Judith and Holofernes.

Recordings
 Ağrı Dağı Efsanesi - The Legend of Mount Ararat Ankara State Opera & Ballet Orchestra, Erol Erdinc

References

Turkish composers
1939 births
Living people